The 2017 Caribbean Cup took place between 22 and 25 June.

Two nations were not members of FIFA.

Martinique
Head coach:

Jamaica
Head coach:  Theodore Whitmore

Curaçao
Head coach:  Remko Bicentini

French Guiana
Head coach:

References 

Squads
Caribbean Cup squads